Puʻuʻokeʻokeʻo is a  mountain peak near Hawaiian Ocean View, Hawaii. This peak is a satellite and sub peak of Mauna Loa.

Mountains of Hawaii